SSE 50 Index is the stock index of Shanghai Stock Exchange, representing the top 50 companies by "float-adjusted" capitalization and other criteria. In order to qualify as a constituent of SSE 50 Index, it must be a constituent of SSE 180 Index, thus SSE 50 is a subindex of SSE 180 Index.  SSE 50 Index is also a subset of SSE Composite Index, which included all stock.

SSE 50 was regarded as a blue-chip index of the exchange.

Constituents

References

Shanghai Stock Exchange
Chinese stock market indices
Lists of companies of China